Colonel Rade Ranđelović  (Serbian Cyrillic: Раде Ранђеловић; born 1962, Bajina Basta, Zlatibor District) was the display pilot of the Serbian Air Force and the commander of the 98th Air Base. Ranđelović was killed in a MiG-29 crash which occurred on 7 July 2009 in Batajnica, Belgrade.  A few days later he was buried with state honours and posthumously promoted to the rank of Colonel.

References

1962 births
2009 deaths
Serbian soldiers
Burials at Belgrade New Cemetery